The Ordre national du Mérite is a French order of merit with membership awarded by the President of the French Republic, founded on 3 December 1963 by President Charles de Gaulle. The reason for the order's establishment was twofold: to replace the large number of ministerial orders previously awarded by the ministries; and to create an award that can be awarded at a lower level than the Legion of Honour, which is generally reserved for French citizens. It comprises about 185,000 members; 306,000 members have been admitted or promoted in 50 years.

History 
The Ordre national du Mérite comprises about 185,000 members; 306,000 members have been admitted or promoted in 50 years. Half of its recipients are required to be women.

Defunct ministerial orders 
The Ordre national du Mérite replaced the following ministerial and colonial orders:

Colonial orders 
 Ordre de l'Étoile d'Anjouan (1874) (Order of the Star of Anjouan)
 Ordre du Nichan El-Anouar (1887) (Order of Nishan-e-Anuar or Order of Light)
 Ordre de l'Étoile Noire (1889) (Order of the Black Star)

Special ministerial orders of merit 

 Ordre du Mérite social  (Order of Societal Merit) (1936)
 Ordre de la Santé publique  (Order of Public Health) (1938)
   (Order of Commercial and Industrial Merit) (1939)
   (Order of Artisanal Merit) (1948)
   (Order of Tourism Merit) (1949)
 Ordre du Mérite combattant  (Order of Combatant Merit) (1953) 
   (Order of Postal Merit) (1953)
   (Order of the National Economy) (1954)
   (Order of Sports Merit) (1956)
   (Order of Work Merit) (1957)
 Ordre du Mérite militaire  (Order of Military Merit) (1957)
 Ordre du Mérite civil  (Order of Civil Merit) (1957)
 Ordre du Mérite Saharien  (Order of Saharan Merit) (1958)

Organisation

Statutes 
French citizens as well as foreign nationals, men and women, can be received into the order for distinguished military or civil achievements, though of a lesser level than that required for the award of the Legion of Honour. The President of the French Republic is the Grand Master of the order and appoints all its members by convention on the advice of the Government of France. The order has a common Chancellor and Chancery with the Legion of Honour. Every Prime Minister of France is made a Grand Cross of the order after 6 months of service. Jacques Chirac, who would later serve as president, was the first prime minister to receive the Grand Cross of the order ex officio.

Classes 
The Order has five classes, the same as the Legion of Honour:

 Three ranks:
Commander (Commandeur): minimum of 5 years in the rank of Officer (for active duty commissioned officers, this is achieved after five years in the rank of Officer)
 Officer (Officier): minimum of 5 years in the rank of Knight (for active duty commissioned officers, this is achieved after seven years in the rank of Knight)
 Knight (Chevalier): to be of a minimum age of 35, have a minimum of 10 years of public service (although, in practice, 15 years is the minimum commonly needed to be conferred the rank of Knight), and "distinguished merits" (for active duty commissioned officers, this is achieved after fifteen years of meritorious service) 
 Two additional dignities:
Grand Cross (Grand-Croix): minimum 3 years in the rank of Grand Officer
 Grand Officer (Grand Officier): minimum 3 years in the rank of Commande

Insignia 
 Knight – wears the Medal on the left chest (bow form for women in dress)
 Officer – wears the Medal with rosette on the left chest (bow form for women in dress)
 Commander – wears the necklet on the neck for men and women (left shoulder in bow form for women in dress)
 Grand Officer – wears the Medal with rosette on the left chest, plus the Star on the right side of the stomach;
 Grand Cross – wears the Sash on the right shoulder to the left hip and the Star on the left side of the stomach.

The medal and the plaque of the Order were designed by the French sculptor Max Leognany.

 The medal of the order is a six-armed Maltese asterisk in gilt (silver for chevalier) enamelled blue, with laurel leaves between the arms. The obverse central disc features the head of Marianne, surrounded by the legend République française (French Republic). The reverse central disc has a set of crossed tricolores, surrounded by the name of the order and its foundation date. The badge is suspended by a laurel wreath.
 The star (plaque) is worn by Grand-Croix (in gilt on the left breast) and Grand Officier (in silver on the right breast) respectively; it is a twelve-armed sunburst, with rays (formerly plain, now in blue enamel) between the arms. The central disc features the head of Marianne, surrounded by the legend République française and the name of the Order, and in turn surrounded by a wreath of laurel.
 The ribbon for the medal is a solid blue field. For the grade of Officier and above, a rosette is centered in the field. For the grades of Commandeur, Grand Officier, and Grand-Croix, the rosette is centered bar of silver; silver and gold, and a solid gold respectively.

Buttonhole

Notable recipients 

The individuals listed below have been admitted as members of the National Order of Merit:

French citizens

Foreign nationals

See also 
 List of Foreign recipients of the Ordre national du Mérite
 Order (decoration)
 Ribbons of the French military and civil awards
 State decoration

References

Citations

Sources

External links 

 France Phaléristique 

Orders, decorations, and medals of France
Orders of chivalry awarded to heads of state, consorts and sovereign family members
Orders of merit
Awards established in 1963
1963 establishments in France